William Sterling Blair  (born April 9, 1954) is a Canadian politician and former police officer who has served as President of the Privy Council and Minister of Emergency Preparedness since October 26, 2021. A member of the Liberal Party, Blair represents Scarborough Southwest in the House of Commons. Blair previously held the portfolios of Minister of Border Security and Organized Crime Reduction and Minister of Public Safety and Emergency Preparedness. Before entering politics, Blair worked for three decades with the Toronto Police Service (TPS), serving as the chief of police from 2005 until retiring in 2015.

Biography 
Blair was born April 9, 1954, in Scarborough, Ontario. Blair's father had served as a police officer for 39 years. Blair considered pursuing a degree in law or finance, when he initially enrolled at the University of Toronto Scarborough in the mid 1970s. Blair initially studied economics at the University of Toronto. He left to follow his ambition of being a police officer, but returned later and completed a Bachelor of Arts in economics and criminology.

Blair is married to Susanne McMaster, and together they have three grown children (2 sons and daughter) and 2 grandchildren.

Police career 
Blair joined the Metropolitan Toronto Police while in university to make money and began taking courses on a part-time basis. Blair walked a beat near Regent Park and later worked as an undercover officer in Toronto's drug squad.

After Blair earned his bachelor's degree in criminology, he advanced his career in the police service in the late 1980s, taking part in drug busts involving the seizure of millions of dollars of cocaine. Chief David Boothby assigned Blair to improve the poor community relations between the officers of 51 Division, which patrolled Blair's old beat near Regent Park. Blair normalized police relations with the community by measures such as sending cops to read to kids in local elementary schools and engaging with local businesses and churches.

In 1999, Blair was considered as a candidate to replace outgoing Chief Boothby, but Mayor Mel Lastman, with the support of Premier Mike Harris, chose to hire Julian Fantino, then head of the York Regional Police. After reorganization of the senior ranks after Fantino's ascension as police chief, Blair became head of detective operations.

Chief of the Toronto Police Service 

Blair was selected in a 4–2 vote of the Toronto Police Services Board in early April 2005, and formally appointed Chief of the Toronto Police Service on April 26, 2005. He succeeded Mike Boyd, who had served as interim chief after the expiry of Julian Fantino's contract. Prior to his appointment as chief, Blair worked for approximately 30 years as a Toronto police officer, with assignments involving drug enforcement, organized crime and major criminal investigations. Blair served as president of the Canadian Association of Chiefs of Police.

In the spring of 2009, Tamil Canadians in Toronto upset by civilian deaths in the Sri Lankan Civil War, which included an overnight artillery bombardment that killed 378 civilians and wounded 1,100, allegedly perpetrated by government forces, staged a series of protests in Toronto, including shutting down the northbound and southbound lanes of University Avenue for four days while protesting in front of the US Consulate, and illegally blocking traffic on the Gardiner Expressway. Blair and the police faced pressure to crack down on the demonstrations, arrest and deporting the protesters. Instead, Blair used his experience in community policing to ensure that minimal force was used, spoke respectfully of the protesters' rights to expression, and negotiated the peaceful resolution of the events. The Canadian Tamil Congress would later award Blair an inaugural "Leaders for Change Award" for his leadership during the protests.

During demonstrations against the G20 Toronto Summit nearly 1,000 arrests were made, making it the largest mass arrest in Canadian history. In the aftermath of the protests, the Toronto Police Service and the Integrated Security Unit (ISU) for the summit were heavily criticized for brutality during the arrests.  Protests called for Blair to resign. In a December 2010 interview, Blair indicated that he would not resign, despite growing criticism of his leadership during and after the summit.

A class action lawsuit was begun against TPS on behalf of all of those who were arrested in spite of the TPS' several attempts to stop proceedings. As of November 10, 2016, the Supreme Court of Canada ruled that it will not hear the Toronto Police Services Board's appeal, and the suit was able to proceed to trial. On August 17, 2020, the lawsuit had resulted in a $16.5 million settlement. Those arrested were each awarded dollar amounts ranging from $5,000 to $24,700.

Responding to questions about a controversial regulation enacted by the Cabinet of Ontario to increase police powers during the summit, Blair was supportive, stating that "it was passed in exactly the procedure as described in our legislation in Ontario." Post-summit reports revealed that on June 25, prior to the start of the summit and shortly after Blair defended a widely reported misinterpretation of the regulation in a press conference, the police department received a government bulletin clarifying the misinterpretation and explaining that the new regulation accorded them no additional power to demand identification outside of the summit perimeter. Blair's spokesperson stated that as of the press conference, Blair was unaware of the clarification; however, Blair did not retract his prior remarks to the press after receiving the bulletin. When interviewed after the summit, Blair confirmed that there was never an extraordinary legal requirement for the public to present identification within five metres of the perimeter fence, but that he "was trying to keep the criminals out." In December 2010, following a critical report by Ontario Ombudsman André Marin, Blair admitted regret that he had initially interpreted the regulation at face value and did not promptly clear up confusion about the meaning of the regulation.

In 2013, Blair came into conflict with Toronto Mayor Rob Ford after confirming to the media that the police had obtained a video of the mayor smoking what appeared to be crack cocaine. Blair said he was "disappointed" in the mayor. As the investigation into the mayor and his friend Alessandro Lisi continued, Mayor Ford dared Blair to arrest him and accused him of wasting money in their surveillance of Ford. Rob Ford's brother, Councillor Doug Ford, claimed that Blair had "gone rogue" and violated the Police Services Act when speaking out about the mayor during the ongoing police investigation. On August 11, 2014, Blair served Councillor Doug Ford with notice of defamation. Doug Ford accused the police chief of using the suit as "payback" in retaliation against the mayor for not extending his contract, but apologized for his comments shortly afterwards.

In his last years in office, Blair was in conflict with several members of the Toronto Police Services Board over resistance to proposed reforms as well as his resistance to cut the police budget. On July 30, 2014, the board announced that it would not renew Blair's contract for a third, five-year term. He retired from the police service when his contract ended on April 25, 2015, and was succeeded by Deputy Chief Mark Saunders.

Political career
Blair declined to comment on his future plans while he was still police chief. The Liberal Party recruited Blair to be its candidate in Scarborough Southwest for the 2015 federal election to be held October. On April 25, 2015, Blair confirmed his intention to seek the Liberal Party nomination in Scarborough Southwest. He won the Liberal nomination on June 13, 2015.

On October 19, 2015, Blair was elected in the Scarborough Southwest riding. On January 28, 2017, Blair was named parliamentary secretary to the minister of justice. In January 2016, Blair was named as the head of the federal-provincial task force tasked with creating a plan for the legalization of cannabis in Canada. On September 19, 2017, Blair assumed the role of parliamentary secretary to the minister of health.

In cabinet
Blair has held a number of roles working with the Department of Public Safety and Emergency Preparedness.

On July 18, 2018, Blair joined Cabinet when he was appointed Minister of Border Security and Organized Crime Reduction. He was made Minister of Public Safety and Emergency Preparedness on November 20, 2019. In his role he oversaw the closure of the border between Canada and the United States during the COVID-19 pandemic.

Blair became President of the Privy Council on October 26, 2021, and dropped public safety from his portfolio, becoming Minister of Emergency Preparedness. In November 2021, Blair oversaw the Royal Canadian Air Force's operations to help those in the Pacific coast of British Columbia amidst torrential rains that caused landslides and floods. Blair played a key role in the federal government's response the Canada convoy protest, where the Emergencies Act was invoked. In September 2022, Blair coordinated the federal response to Hurricane Fiona.

Awards and recognition
In 2007, he was appointed an Officer of the Order of Merit of the Police Forces and in 2012, he was elevated within the Order to the level of Commander. He is a Member of the Venerable Order of Saint John. On January 19, 2013, Blair was honoured by the Canadian Tamil Congress, with their inaugural "Leaders for Change Award" for his exemplary leadership during the protests of 2009 in Toronto.

Electoral record

References

External links

 
 Official site
 Bio & mandate from the Prime Minister

Toronto police chiefs
University of Toronto alumni
Living people
People from Old Toronto
People from Scarborough, Toronto
1954 births
Liberal Party of Canada MPs
Members of the 29th Canadian Ministry
Members of the House of Commons of Canada from Ontario
Members of the King's Privy Council for Canada
21st-century Canadian politicians